Hayley Trevean (born 10 August 1988) is an Australian rules footballer who played for  in the AFL Women's competition (AFLW). She made her debut in Carlton's final match of 2017, in round 7 against  at Ikon Park. She was subsequently delisted at season's end. Hayley played the 2018 season with the Geelong Cats VFLW team, and was listed in their inaugural AFLW team for 2019.

References

External links

Living people
1988 births
Carlton Football Club (AFLW) players
Australian rules footballers from Victoria (Australia)
Sportswomen from Victoria (Australia)